Jean-Paul Leroux (born January 7, 1976) is a Venezuelan film actor. His career started in small roles in theater, but his true career started in the critically acclaimed movie Secuestro Express in 2005, along with Argentine actress Mía Maestro. He also appeared in the 2006 Venezuelan film Elipsis along with Gaby Espino, Edgar Ramirez and Christina Dieckmann among others. He acted in the unrealesed Spanish-Venezuelan film Lo Que Tiene el Otro, directed by Miguel Perello. He also played the starring role in "Por Un Polvo", a Venezuelan Film by Carlos Malave. In 2007 he acted in the Colombian Film "La Vida era en Serio" directed by Monica Borda. And recently played the starring role in the Venezuelan Film "Las Caras del Diablo"

Filmography

Telenovelas
 Ciudad Bendita (2006-2007) as Jerry Colón
 La Trepadora (2008) as Nicolás Del Casal
 Quiero amarte (2013) as Jorge de la Parra
 Las Bandidas (2013) as Sergio Navarro
 2091 (2016) as Reznik

External links 

Interview with Leroux 
 Jeanpaulleroux.com - Official site 
Secuestro Express - Official site.

Living people
Venezuelan male film actors
Venezuelan male stage actors
1976 births